is a Japanese professional footballer who plays as a forward or a winger for C.D. Santa Clara in the Primeira Liga.

Club career
Tagawa progressed through the youth ranks of Sagan Tosu, and made his debut on 5 March against Kawasaki Frontale, when he replaced Takamitsu Tomiyama in a 1-1 draw.

International career
In May 2017, Tagawa was elected Japan U-20 national team for 2017 U-20 World Cup. At this tournament, he played 2 matches.

Career statistics

International

Scores and results list Japan's goal tally first.

References

External links

 Profile at Sagan Tosu
 

1999 births
Living people
Sportspeople from Kagoshima Prefecture
Association football people from Kagoshima Prefecture
Japanese footballers
Japan youth international footballers
Japan international footballers
Association football forwards
Japanese expatriate footballers
Japanese expatriate sportspeople in Portugal
Sagan Tosu players
FC Tokyo players
FC Tokyo U-23 players
C.D. Santa Clara players
J1 League players
J3 League players
Primeira Liga players